William Howard Taft Charter High School is a public school located on the corner of Ventura Boulevard and Winnetka Avenue in the Woodland Hills district of the San Fernando Valley in Los Angeles, California, within the Los Angeles Unified School District. The school gained affiliated charter status beginning with the 2013–2014 school year.

History
Named after former U.S. president William Howard Taft, the school first opened in 1960.

It was in the Los Angeles City High School District until 1961, when it merged into LAUSD.

In the 2013–2014 school year, Taft High School became a charter school.

Notable alumni

Jeshua Anderson – track and field sprinter
Rick Auerbach – MLB shortstop 1971–1981
Steve Bartek – musician, Strawberry Alarm Clock, Oingo Boingo
Matteo Barzini – Italian filmmaker
Justine Bateman – actress, TV series Family Ties
Mike Bercovici – college and pro football quarterback
Scott Bloch – Office of Special Counsel
Mike Borzello – 5-time World Series champion. Chicago Cubs, Los Angeles Dodgers, New York Yankees
Craig Buck – Olympic volleyball player
Phil Buckman – musician, actor, and voiceover artist, bass player for Filter
Kihei Clark – NCAA champion basketball player at Virginia
DeAndre Daniels – professional basketball player, college player at UConn
Bryce Dejean-Jones – basketball shooting guard
Larry Dierker – MLB pitcher, manager, broadcaster
Spencer Dinwiddie – NBA point guard for the Dallas Mavericks
Larry Drew II – basketball point guard
Eazy-E – rapper, West Coast hip hop
Everlast – rapper/singer House of Pain
Jordan Farmar – basketball point guard, 2-time NBA champion
William Finnegan – Pulitzer Prize winning writer surfing essayist
Jeff Fisher – Former NFL player and Titans coach from 1995 to 2010, as well as Rams from 2012 to 2016
Char Fontane – actress and singer
Barry Green – orchestral and solo double bass player and teacher
Guy Hansen – professional baseball pitcher and coach
Steve Hartman – sportscaster
Ice Cube – rapper, actor, director, producer, Friday, Are We There Yet?, Straight Outta Compton
Airabin Justin –  NFL and CFL defensive back
Gabe Kapler – Former MLB outfielder and current San Francisco Giants manager, 2021 National League Manager of the Year 
Brad Kearns – professional triathlete, Guinness world record speedgolfer, The New York Times bestselling author
Kevin Kennedy – MLB manager and radio-TV baseball commentator
Dave Koz – smooth jazz saxophonist, radio personality
Lisa Kudrow – actress, TV series Friends
Pete LaCock – MLB first baseman and coach
Dale Launer – comedy screenwriter
Epic Mazur – vocalist, rapper, and record producer
Maureen McCormick – actress, TV series The Brady Bunch
Danny Boy O’Connor – rapper, House of Pain
Susan Olsen – actress, TV series The Brady Bunch
Kelly Paris – MLB third baseman
Dana Plato – actress, TV series Diff'rent Strokes
DaShon Polk – NFL linebacker
Paul Pratt – NFL defensive back for Detroit Lions
Malcolm Smith – Super Bowl XLVIII champion and MVP
Steve Smith – NFL wide receiver, Super Bowl XLII champion
Jan Smithers – actress, TV series WKRP in Cincinnati
Jeff Stork – volleyball Hall of Famer, member of 1988 Summer Olympics gold-medal U.S. men's team
Kathryn Dwyer Sullivan – NASA Space Shuttle astronaut
 Michael Thomas – NFL Pro Bowl wide receiver, New Orleans Saints
 Justin Tryon – NFL cornerback
Mark Tulin – musician, founding member of The Electric Prunes
Wilmer Valderrama – actor, TV series That '70s Show
 Holly Beth Vincent – musician, member of Holly and the Italians
Duffy Waldorf – professional golfer, member of UCLA Sports Hall of Fame
Quincy Watts – athlete, winner of two gold medals at 1992 Summer Olympics
Darrion Weems – NFL offensive tackle
Jane Wiedlin – musician, singer and original member of band The Go-Go's 
Brad Wilk – drummer for Rage Against the Machine, Audioslave
Antwaun Woods – Nose tackle for the Dallas Cowboys, college Defensive Lineman of the Year in 2016
Robin Wright – actress, The Princess Bride, Forrest Gump, House of Cards, Wonder Woman
Larry Yount – MLB pitcher
Robin Yount – Baseball Hall of Fame player, 19 seasons with Milwaukee Brewers of MLB

References

External links

 Official William Howard Taft Charter High School website
 Great Schools Inc.org: "Taft Senior High School"
 U.S.News.com: "Taft High School"
 LAschoolboard.org: Taft High School 2013-2018 Charter Term – (Archive).
	

Taft
Taft
Taft
Taft
Taft
Educational institutions established in 1960
1960 establishments in California
Taft
Taft